David Bradley may refer to:

Entertainment
 David Bradley (director) (1920–1997), American director
 David Bradley (English actor) (born 1942), English actor
 David Bradley (novelist) (born 1950), American author of The Chaneysville Incident
 Dai Bradley (born 1953), English actor, born David Bradley, credited as such in the film Kes
 David Bradley (American actor) (born 1953), actor in the American Ninja series
 David Bradley (Native American artist) (born 1954), American artist
 David W. Bradley (born 1955), American game designer

Politics
 David J. Bradley (1915–2008), American politician, member of New Hampshire House of Representatives, author, and skier 
 David Bradley (politician) (1952–2022), American politician, member of the Arizona Senate

Other
 David Bradley (plowman) (1811–1899), American businessman
 David Bradley (engineer) (born 1949), American IBM engineer, helped develop IBM PC
 David G. Bradley (born 1953), American businessman and magazine publisher, owner of The Atlantic
 David Bradley (footballer) (born 1958), English footballer
 David Bradley (UK journalist) (born 1966), British editor of Sciencebase magazine
 David Bradley (linguist), American linguist who specializes in the Tibeto-Burman languages of South East Asia

See also
Dave Bradley (1947–2010), American football player